Hanna Fahl (born October 23, 1978 in Lidköping) is a Swedish music journalist and translator. She is also the host of P3 Pop, a radio show on P3, Sveriges Radio. She sings vocals and plays flute in Kissing Mirrors, a death-pop band from Stockholm.

References

External links
P3 Pop Homepage

1978 births
Living people
Swedish journalists
Swedish translators
Swedish women writers
People from Lidköping Municipality